MY Ocean Warrior is a cutter-class vessel owned and operated by the Sea Shepherd Conservation Society as research/survey patrol vessel. She is used in their direct action campaigns against whaling and illegal fisheries activities.

Overview
On January 26, 2015, at the annual Goed Geld Gala (Good Money Gala) in Amsterdam, Sea Shepherd received a donation of €8.3 million ($9.4 million) from the Nationale Postcode Loterij in the Netherlands, to purchase a new vessel for Sea Shepherd's submitted dream project "Stop Illegal Fishing in the Southern Ocean". The vessel was custom-built by Dutch ship builder Damen Group in Turkey, with a final cost of $12 million. This custom-built ship is a Damen Stan patrol vessel 50m long and 9m wide. She was laid down in 2015 and was launched at the shipyards of Damen Group in Antalya Turkey on 1 July 2016.

Ocean Warrior has four engines, additional long-range fuel tanks, and a helicopter landing pad. She is also equipped with a heavy water cannon on her stern. Her maiden voyage was to the Southern Ocean.

References

External links
Damen Stan Patrol 5009 - Product Sheet at Damen Group (PDF)

Sea Shepherd Conservation Society ships
2016 ships
Ships built in Antalya